The San Francisco Film Critics Circle Award for Best Documentary Film is an award given by the San Francisco Film Critics Circle to honor an outstanding documentary film.

Winners

2000s

2010s

2020s

References

San Francisco Film Critics Circle Awards
American documentary film awards